Friedrich August Schulze (1 June 1770 – 4 September 1849) was a German novelist, who wrote under the pen name Friedrich Laun. Schulze was born in Dresden. His first novel, Der Mann, auf Freiersfüssen (1801), was favorably received. He wrote many volumes, and with August Apel edited a ghost story anthology Gespensterbuch ('Book of Ghosts') (1810–1815). Thomas de Quincey, who translated several of Laun's stories into English, noted his "great popularity" and opined, "the unelaborate narratives of Laun are mines of what is called Fun".

References

External links

 
 
 

1770 births
1849 deaths
18th-century German novelists
Writers from Dresden
German male novelists
19th-century German novelists
18th-century German male writers